Ingall is a surname. Notable people with the surname include:

 Francis Ingall (1908–1998), British Indian Army officer
 Lisa Ingall (born 1980), English snooker player
 Marjorie Ingall (born 20th century), American non-fiction writer
 Michael Ingall (born 1959), British businessman
 Russell Ingall (born 1964), English-born Australian Supercar driver

Other uses
 Fort Ingall, a reconstructed fort museum in Quebec

See also
 Ingalls (disambiguation)
 In-Gall, a town in Niger